Packards Corner station (announced as Brighton Avenue/Packards Corner) is a light rail stop on the MBTA's Green Line B branch located at Packard's Corner - the intersection of Commonwealth Avenue and Brighton Avenue - in Allston, Boston, Massachusetts.  The station is located in a median between the westbound travel lanes and frontage road of Commonwealth Avenue.

History
The Green Line A branch formerly diverged just north of the platforms; its trolleys stopped at separate Packards Corner platforms on Brighton Avenue. The Brighton Avenue streetcar reservation was removed from July 1 to October 5, 1949, and the side platforms for the Watertown Line were replaced with an island platform. The A branch was closed on June 21, 1969 and replaced with the route  bus, though the trackage was retained for non-revenue moves to Watertown Yard. The line was finally abandoned in 1994; a several-hundred-foot stub track was left until the mid-2000s to temporarily store disabled trains. The switch and the last few feet of track were not disconnected until track work in 2014.

Packards Corner was not made accessible during the initial 2001–03 round of Green Line station renovations. In 2019, the MBTA listed Packards Corner as a "Tier I" accessibility priority. Track work in 2018–19, which included replacement of platform edges at several stops, triggered requirements for accessibility modifications at those stops. By December 2022, design for Packards Corner and four other B Branch stops was 30% complete, with construction expected to last from fall 2023 to mid-2024.

References

External links

MBTA – Packards Corner
Station from Brighton Avenue from Google Maps Street View

Green Line (MBTA) stations
Railway stations in Boston